The 1963–64 AHL season was the 28th season of the American Hockey League. Nine teams played 72 games each in the schedule. The Quebec Aces finished first overall in the regular season. The Cleveland Barons won their ninth Calder Cup championship.

Final standings
Note: GP = Games played; W = Wins; L = Losses; T = Ties; GF = Goals for; GA = Goals against; Pts = Points;

Scoring leaders

Note: GP = Games played; G = Goals; A = Assists; Pts = Points; PIM = Penalty minutes

 complete list

Calder Cup playoffs
First round
Quebec Aces defeated Pittsburgh Hornets 4 games to 1.
Hershey Bears defeated Providence Reds 2 games to 1.
Cleveland Barons defeated Rochester Americans 2 games to 0.
Second round
Quebec Aces earned second round bye.
Cleveland Barons defeated Hershey Bears 3 games to 0.  
Finals
Cleveland Barons defeated Quebec Aces 4 games to 0, to win the Calder Cup. 
 list of scores

Trophy and award winners
Team awards

Individual awards

Other awards

See also
List of AHL seasons

References
AHL official site
AHL Hall of Fame
HockeyDB

American Hockey League seasons
2
2